Arthur Jack Zander (May 3, 1908 – December 17, 2007) was an American animator whose career lasted from the "golden age" of theatrical animation into the 1980s.

Biography
Jack Zander was born on May 3, 1908, in Kalamazoo, Michigan as Arthur Jack Zander. His first job in Animation was at the Romer Grey Studio in 1930. One year later he joined The Van Beuren Corporation followed by Terrytoons in 1936.

He joined the Metro-Goldwyn-Mayer cartoon studio in 1937, and worked on MGM cartoons based on comic strips, including The Captain and the Kids and Count Screwloose. He also worked on Harman-Ising cartoons at MGM, including The Little Goldfish (1939), Goldilocks and the Three Bears (1939), The Mad Maestro (1939) and the Barney Bear series. Among other cartoons he helped animate were Puss Gets the Boot (1940), The Midnight Snack (1941), The Night Before Christmas (1941), Fraidy Cat (1942), Fine Feathered Friend (1942), War Dogs (1943) and Sufferin' Cats! (1943). He left MGM in 1942.

In 1970, he formed Zander's Animation Parlour in New York City where he made commercials for AT&T, the U.S. Postal Service, Kraft Foods, Arm & Hammer, Pepsi, Visine, and more until his retirement. In 1984, he created "Tippi Turtle", an obnoxious character who enjoyed playing practical jokes, in three animated shorts Saturday Night Live.

Awards
Zander was nominated for an Outstanding Animated Program Emmy in 1981 for Gnomes, and in 1984 he won the Motion Picture Screen Cartoonists' Golden Award.

Death
Zander died at his home in New York on December 17, 2007.

Footnotes

References
July 2007 interview with Animation World

External links

1908 births
2007 deaths
People from Kalamazoo, Michigan
Animators from Michigan
American animated film producers
Metro-Goldwyn-Mayer cartoon studio people